Encina High School is an American 6-12 public school located in Arden-Arcade, California. It is a member of the San Juan Unified School District located on the western end of the SJUSD.  While the school thrived during its early years of existence and into the 1980s, it has since suffered from low enrollment and been suggested for closure several times in its recent history. It includes the Advanced Path Program students. Richard Judge is the current high school principal; Heidi Garner and Michelle Speed act as vice principals.

Encina students come from the surrounding Arden Arcade area and their biggest school rival would be San Juan High School, also located within the SJUSD. Encina currently offers a 7 period modified block schedule which includes an Advocacy class daily.

Encina High School opened its doors September 2, 1958, welcoming freshmen and sophomore classes and graduated their first class in the spring of 1961. Students were asked for their input on school colors and mascot and choose Cardinal Red and Gold and the Apaches. During the 1989–1990 school year, the San Juan Unified School District requested that Encina change their mascot from an Apache to something more culturally sensitive, and so the class of 1991 were the very first Encina Bulldogs. In 1995 Encina garnered national attention when a riot broke out after on campus police officers used pepper spray and batons against students in the cafeteria. Students involved in the incident insisted that it was the overreaction of law enforcement to an argument between two youths that led to six students being arrested and nine others being sent to the hospital to be treated for bruises and adverse reactions to inhaling pepper spray.

While plagued with isolated acts of violence in previous years, there have been no major disturbances on campus during the past decade. Encina is known for its rich basketball tradition and every year since 2000 a fundraiser basketball game is played between the alumni and current students which raises thousands of dollars that go towards improving student programs for the kids. Located in the heart of Arden, the campus is just one mile east of Arden Fair Mall.

Demographics
Currently, the school has approximately 1100 students where large populations of African American, Hispanic/Latino, White, Middle Eastern, and Asian/Pacific Islanders are represented. The school also educates many immigrants whose main languages include
Spanish, Russian, and Ukrainian among others.

Notable alumni
 Barbara Alby (did not graduate) – California Assemblywoman
 Miguel Aguilar - Midfielder for LA Galaxy II
 Jim Eakins - former NBA/ABA center.
 John F. Goodman - Retired United States Marine Corps Lieutenant General; Former NFL Quarterback; 1st inductee into Encina High School Hall of Fame on April 29, 2011.
 Rich Piana - Bodybuilder/Mr.California
 Timothy B. Schmit - bass player for The Eagles.
 David J. Wineland - 2012 Nobel Prize winner for physics
 Sherilyn Wolter - daytime soap opera actress

References

External links
 Encina High School Webpage
  School Accountability Report Card (SARC)
  API Statistics

High schools in Sacramento, California
Public high schools in California
Public middle schools in California
1958 establishments in California